NGC 280 is a spiral galaxy in the constellation Andromeda. It was discovered on December 5, 1785 by William Herschel.

References

External links
 

0280
Andromeda (constellation)
17851205
Spiral galaxies
Discoveries by William Herschel
003076